Prostaglandin-endoperoxide synthase 2 (prostaglandin G/H synthase and cyclooxygenase) (The HUGO official symbol is PTGS2; HGNC ID, HGNC:9605), also known as cyclooxygenase-2 or COX-2, is an enzyme that in humans is encoded by the PTGS2 gene. In humans it is one of two cyclooxygenases. It is involved in the conversion of arachidonic acid to prostaglandin H2, an important precursor of prostacyclin, which is expressed in inflammation.

Function 

PTGS2 (COX-2),  converts arachidonic acid (AA) to prostaglandin endoperoxide H2. PTGSs are targets for NSAIDs and PTGS2 (COX-2) specific inhibitors called coxibs. PTGS-2 is a sequence homodimer. Each monomer of the enzyme has a peroxidase and a PTGS (COX) active site. The PTGS (COX) enzymes catalyze the conversion of arachidonic acid to prostaglandins in two steps. First, hydrogen is abstracted from carbon 13 of arachidonic acid, and then two molecules of oxygen are added by the PTGS2 (COX-2), giving PGG2. Second, PGG2 is reduced to PGH2 in the peroxidase active site. The synthesized PGH2 is  converted to prostaglandins (PGD2, PGE2, PGF2α), prostacyclin (PGI2), or thromboxane A2  by tissue-specific isomerases.(Figure 2)

While metabolizing arachidonic acid primarily to PGG2, COX-2 also converts this fatty acid to small amounts of a racemic mixture of 15-Hydroxyicosatetraenoic acids (i.e., 15-HETEs) composed of ~22% 15(R)-HETE and ~78% 15(S)-HETE stereoisomers as well as a small amount of 11(R)-HETE. The two 15-HETE stereoisomers have intrinsic biological activities but, perhaps more importantly, can be further metabolized to a major class of agents, the lipoxins.  Furthermore, aspirin-treated COX-2 metabolizes arachidonic acid almost exclusively to 15(R)-HETE which product can be further metabolized to epi-lipoxins.  The lipoxins and epi-lipoxins are potent anti-inflammatory agents and may contribute to the overall activities of the two COX's as well as to aspirin.

COX-2 is naturally inhibited by calcitriol (the active form of Vitamin D).

Mechanism 

Both the peroxidase and PTGS activities are inactivated during catalysis by mechanism-based, first-order processes, which means that PGHS-2 peroxidase or PTGS activities fall to zero within 1–2 minutes, even in the presence of sufficient substrates.

The conversion of arachidonic acid to PGG2  can be shown as a series of radical reactions analogous to polyunsaturated fatty acid autoxidation. The 13-pro(S) -hydrogen is abstracted and dioxygen  traps the pentadienyl radical at carbon 11. The 11-peroxyl radical cyclizes at carbon 9 and the carbon-centered radical generated at C-8 cyclizes at carbon 12, generating the endoperoxide. The allylic radical generated is trapped by dioxygen  at carbon 15 to form the 15-(S) -peroxyl radical; this radical is then reduced to PGG2 . This is supported by the following evidence: 1) a significant kinetic isotope effect is observed for the abstraction of the 13-pro (S )-hydrogen; 2) carbon-centered radicals are trapped during catalysis; 3) small amounts of oxidation products are formed due to the oxygen trapping of an allylic radical intermediate at positions 13 and 15.

Another mechanism in which the 13-pro (S )-hydrogen is deprotonated and the carbanion is oxidized to a radical is theoretically possible. However, oxygenation of 10,10-difluoroarachidonic acid to 11-(S )-hydroxyeicosa-5,8,12,14-tetraenoic acid is not consistent with the generation of a carbanion intermediate because it would eliminate fluoride to form a conjugated diene.  The absence of endoperoxide-containing products derived from 10,10-difluoroarachidonic acid has been thought to indicate the importance of a C-10 carbocation in PGG2  synthesis. However, the cationic mechanism requires that endoperoxide formation comes before the removal of the 13-pro (S )-hydrogen. This is not consistent with the results of the isotope experiments of arachidonic acid oxygenation.

Structure 

PTGS2 (COX-2) exists as a homodimer, each monomer with a molecular mass of about 70 kDa. The tertiary and quaternary structures of PTGS1 (COX-1) and PTGS2 (COX-2) enzymes are almost identical. Each subunit has three different structural domains: a short N-terminal epidermal growth factor (EGF) domain; an α-helical membrane-binding moiety; and a C-terminal catalytic domain. PTGS (COX, which can be confused with "cytochrome oxidase") enzymes are monotopic membrane proteins; the membrane-binding domain consists of a series of amphipathic α helices with several hydrophobic amino acids exposed to a membrane monolayer. PTGS1 (COX-1) and PTGS2 (COX-2) are bifunctional enzymes that carry out two consecutive chemical reactions in spatially distinct but mechanistically coupled active sites. Both the cyclooxygenase and the peroxidase active sites are located in the catalytic domain, which accounts for approximately 80% of the protein. The catalytic domain is homologous to mammalian peroxidases such as myeloperoxidase.

It has been found that human PTGS2 (COX-2) functions as a conformational heterodimer having a catalytic monomer (E-cat) and an allosteric monomer (E-allo). Heme binds only to the peroxidase site of E-cat while substrates, as well as certain inhibitors (e.g. celecoxib), bind the COX site of E-cat. E-cat is regulated by E-allo in a way dependent on what ligand is bound to E-allo. Substrate and non-substrate fatty acid (FAs) and some PTGS (COX) inhibitors (e.g. naproxen) preferentially bind to the PTGS (COX) site of E-allo. Arachidonic acid can bind to E-cat and E-allo, but the affinity of AA for E-allo is 25 times that for Ecat. Palmitic acid, an efficacious stimulator of huPGHS-2, binds only E-allo in palmitic acid/murine PGHS-2 co-crystals. Non-substrate FAs can potentiate or attenuate  PTGS (COX) inhibitors depending on the fatty acid and whether the inhibitor binds E-cat or E-allo. Studies suggest that the concentration and composition of the free fatty acid pool in the environment in which PGHS-2 functions in cells, also referred to as the FA tone, is a key factor regulating the activity of PGHS-2  and its response to PTGS (COX) inhibitors.

Clinical significance 

PTGS2 (COX-2) is unexpressed under normal conditions in most cells, but elevated levels are found during inflammation. PTGS1 (COX-1) is constitutively expressed in many tissues and is the predominant form in gastric mucosa and in the kidneys. Inhibition of PTGS1 (COX-1) reduces the basal production of cytoprotective PGE2 and PGI2 in the stomach, which may contribute to gastric ulceration. Since PTGS2 (COX-2) is generally expressed only in cells where prostaglandins are upregulated (e.g., during inflammation), drug-candidates that selectively inhibit PTGS2 (COX-2) were suspected to show fewer side-effects but proved to substantially increase risk for cardiovascular events such as heart attack and stroke. Two different mechanisms may explain contradictory effects. Low-dose aspirin protects against heart attacks and strokes by blocking PTGS1 (COX-1) from forming a prostaglandin called thromboxane A2.  It sticks platelets together and promotes clotting; inhibiting this helps prevent heart disease. On the other hand, PTGS2 (COX-2) is a more important source of prostaglandins, particularly prostacyclin which is found in blood vessel lining.  Prostacyclin relaxes or unsticks platelets, so selective COX-2 inhibitors (coxibs) increase risk of cardiovascular events due to clotting.

Non-steroidal anti-inflammatory drugs (NSAIDs) inhibit prostaglandin production by PTGS1 (COX-1) and PTGS2 (COX-2). NSAIDs selective for inhibition of PTGS2 (COX-2) are less likely than traditional drugs to cause  gastrointestinal adverse effects, but could cause cardiovascular events, such as heart failure, myocardial infarction, and stroke. Studies with human pharmacology and genetics, genetically manipulated rodents, and other animal models and randomized trials indicate that this is due to suppression of PTGS2 (COX-2)-dependent cardioprotective prostaglandins,  prostacyclin in particular.

The expression of PTGS2 (COX-2) is upregulated in many cancers. The overexpression of PTGS2 (COX-2) along with increased angiogenesis and SLC2A1 (GLUT-1) expression is significantly associated  with gallbladder carcinomas.  Furthermore, the product of PTGS2 (COX-2), PGH2 is converted by prostaglandin E2 synthase into PGE2, which in turn can stimulate cancer progression.  Consequently, inhibiting PTGS2 (COX-2) may have benefit in the prevention and treatment of these types of cancer.

COX-2 expression was found in human idiopathic epiretinal membranes. Cyclooxygenases blocking by lornoxicam in acute stage of inflammation reduced the frequency of membrane formation by 43% in the dispase model of PVR and by 31% in the concanavalin one. Lornoxicam not only normalized the expression of cyclooxygenases in both models of PVR, but also neutralized the changes of the retina and the choroid thickness caused by the injection of pro-inflammatory agents. These facts underline the importance of cyclooxygenases and prostaglandins in the development of PVR.

PTGS2 gene upregulation has also been linked with multiple stages of human reproduction. Presence of gene is found in the chorionic plate, in the amnion epithelium, syncytiotrophoblasts, villous fibroblasts, chorionic trophoblasts, amniotic trophoblasts, as well as the basal plate of the placenta, in the decidual cells and extravillous cytotrophoblasts. During the process of chorioamnionitis/deciduitis, the upregulation of PTGS2 in the amnion and choriodecidua is one of three limited effects of inflammation in the uterus. Increased expression of the PTGS2 gene in the fetal membranes is connected to the presence of inflammation, causing uterine prostaglandin gene expression and immunolocalization of prostaglandin pathway proteins in chorionic trophoblast cells and adjacent decidua, or choriodecidua. PTGS2 is linked with the inflammatory system and has been observed in inflammatory leukocytes. It has been noted that there is a positive correlation with PTGS2 expression in the amnion during spontaneous labour and was discovered to have increased expression with gestational age following the presence of labour with no change observed in amnion and choriodecidua during either preterm or term labour. Additionally, oxytocin stimulates the expression of PTGS2 in myometrial cells.

The mutant allele PTGS2 5939C carriers among the Han Chinese population have been shown to have a higher risk of gastric cancer. In addition, a connection was found between Helicobacter pylori infection and the presence of the 5939C allele.

Interactions 
PTGS2 has been shown to interact with caveolin 1.

History 
PTGS2 (COX-2) was discovered in 1991 by the Daniel Simmons laboratory at Brigham Young University.

See also 
 Arachidonic acid
 Cyclooxygenase
 Cyclooxygenase 1
 NSAID
 Discovery and development of COX-2 selective inhibitors
 COX-2 selective inhibitor

References

Further reading

External links 
Nextbio 
NSAIDs and Cardiovascular Risk Explained, According to Studies from the Perelman School of Medicine
 

Prostaglandins